Harry Newton (2 May 1935 – 22 December 2014) was an English cricketer. Newton was a right-handed batsman who bowled right-arm fast-medium. He was born at Little Lever, Lancashire.

Newton made two first-class appearances for Sussex against Hampshire and Essex in the 1966 County Championship. Against Hampshire, Newton ended unbeaten on 16 in Sussex's first-innings of 153, while in Hampshire's first-innings he took what would be his only first-class five wicket haul, with figures of 5/54 from 32 overs to help bowl Hampshire out for 128. He was again unbeaten during Sussex's second-innings, though without scoring, while in Hampshire's second-innings he bowled 10 wicketless overs. Hampshire won the match by 9 wickets. Against Essex, he was dismissed for a duck by Brian Edmeades in Sussex's first-innings total of 86, while in Essex's first-innings he took the wicket of Barry Knight, finishing with figures of 1/28 from 20 overs. He was again dismissed for a duck in Sussex's second-innings, this time by Tony Jorden, with Sussex being dismissed for 132 to set Essex a target of 66, which they easily chased down to win by 9 wickets.  These were his only major appearances for Sussex.

References

External links
Harry Newton at ESPNcricinfo
Harry Newton at CricketArchive

1935 births
2014 deaths
People from Little Lever
English cricketers
Sussex cricketers